The 1932–33 season was Burnley's 45th season of league football.

Transfers

Football League Second Division

Match results
Key

In Result column, Burnley's score shown first
H = Home match
A = Away match
pen. = Penalty kick
o.g. = Own goal

Results

FA Cup

Match results
Key

In Result column, Burnley's score shown first
H = Home match
A = Away match

pen. = Penalty kick
o.g. = Own goal
— = Attendance not known

Results

Player details

Player statistics

Notes

References

Burnley F.C. seasons
Burnley